North Philadelphia/East is a neighborhood in the eastern central part of North Philadelphia section of Philadelphia, Pennsylvania, United States.

North Philadelphia/East is the section of North Philadelphia located on the eastern side of North Broad St which is bordered by Vine St in the south, West Erie Avenue in the north and North Front Street in the east. North Philadelphia/East is bordered by the neighborhoods of Kensington, Center City, North Philadelphia/West and Hunting Park.  North Central, Philadelphia is west of North Philadelphia East.

In 2013, the neighborhood with the 19133 zip code located in North Philadelphia East has "among the city's highest rates of people living with HIV and AIDS". Of the people living with HIV and AIDS in the region 52.93% are Hispanic, 39.83% are black and 7.24% are white. In 2011, the poverty rate in the region was 56.4%, almost double the average in Philadelphia that year.

Demographics
North Philadelphia/East is home to a majority of Philadelphia's Latino community. The community is "rich in arts and culture".

In March 2018, the section had a 24.05% unemployment rate with 48.97% living in poverty.

References 

Neighborhoods in Philadelphia
North Philadelphia